Bhuta Lakshmipur is a village in Barisal District in the Barisal Division of southern-central Bangladesh. It is located at 22°49′N 90°31′E in Bangladesh.

References

Populated places in Barisal District